Cordisepalum is a genus of flowering plants belonging to the family Convolvulaceae.

Its native range is Indo-China.

Species:

Cordisepalum phalanthopetalum 
Cordisepalum thorelii

References

Convolvulaceae
Convolvulaceae genera